World Expo Park was an amusement park built for Expo '88 in Brisbane, Australia. It was positioned on the corner of Melbourne and Glenelg Streets in South Brisbane, the former site of railway sidings for South Brisbane Station, and the current site of the Brisbane Convention & Exhibition Centre. The park was opened when the exposition opened on the 30 April 1988. Admission to the park was included in the price of the ticket to the World Expo.

World Expo Park contained three roller coasters, one indoor and two outdoor. The later was called the Titan, renamed as The Demon and operated at Wonderland Sydney before being relocated to Alabama as the Zoomerang. The other outdoor rollercoaster was known as the Centrifuge, a suspended coaster with swinging turns.  The indoor rollercoaster was known as the Supernova. The amusement park was closed in 1989 due to its lack of popularity.

See also

List of amusement parks in Oceania

References

Defunct amusement parks in Australia
Buildings and structures in Brisbane
1988 establishments in Australia
1989 disestablishments in Australia
World's fair sites in Australia
Amusement parks in Queensland
Amusement parks opened in 1988
Amusement parks closed in 1989
Park